White Rock is a 1977 documentary film about the 1976 Winter Olympics held in Innsbruck, Austria. The film was narrated by James Coburn, and directed by Tony Maylam. The film was nominated in 1977 for the Robert Flaherty Award (Feature Length Film, Documentary In Content) by the British Academy of Film and Television Arts. A soundtrack album, White Rock was released by Rick Wakeman in 1977 and it entered the UK Albums Chart on 12 February 1977, where it spent 9 weeks and reached number 14.

Production and release
Michael Samuelson was given the chance to make the 1976 Winter Olympics film, and he contacted Tony Maylam to direct and write the film. However, they felt that only two films had "worked". Olympia by Leni Riefenstahl of the 1936 Summer Olympics held in Berlin and the Kon Ichikawa film Tokyo Olympiad of the 1964 Summer Olympics held in Tokyo. They decided that they did not want the film to be a documentary, but a feature film.

Tony Maylam made two music movies White Rock and Genesis: In Concert, also known as the Genesis Concert Movie, which is a movie shot in concert at The Apollo Theatre, Glasgow and the New Bingley Hall, Stafford with the rock group Genesis. They were screened together as a double bill. Rock promoters Harvey Weinstein and Bob Weinstein purchased the films for the US market and distributed them as Sensasia.

See also

Cinema of the United Kingdom
Winter Olympic Games

Notes

External links

1977 films
Documentary films about the Olympics
1977 documentary films
Films about the 1976 Winter Olympics
1970s English-language films
British sports documentary films
1970s British films